Rita Wilson (born Margarita Ibrahimoff; October 26, 1956) is an American actress, singer, and producer. Her film appearances include Volunteers (1985), Sleepless in Seattle (1993), Now and Then (1995), That Thing You Do! (1996), Jingle All the Way (1996), The Story of Us (1999), Runaway Bride (1999), It's Complicated (2009), and Larry Crowne (2011), and she appeared in the television series The Good Wife and Girls. Wilson has performed on Broadway and produced several films, including My Big Fat Greek Wedding (2002). As a singer-songwriter, Wilson has released the albums AM/FM, Rita Wilson, Bigger Picture, and Halfway to Home. In March 2019, she received a star on the Hollywood Walk of Fame.

Early life 
Rita Wilson was born Margarita Ibrahimoff in Los Angeles where she grew up. Her mother, Dorothea Tzigkou, was Greek, raised in Sotirë near Dropull i Sipërm in Albania, close to the border with Greece. Her father, Hassan Halilov Ibrahimoff (1920–2009), was a Bulgarian Muslim (Pomak) born in Oraio (Breshtene), Greece, close to the border with Bulgaria. Her father's family moved to Bulgaria when he was a child. He moved from Bulgaria to the US in 1949. He converted from Islam to Orthodox Christianity upon his marriage and changed his name to Allan Wilson in 1960, choosing his name after a local street. The family lived in Los Angeles, where Wilson's father worked as a bartender. Wilson was raised in the Greek Orthodox faith. In addition to Bulgarian, her father could speak "Russian, Turkish, Polish, Greek, a little bit of Italian, a little bit of French" according to Wilson's husband Tom Hanks, who said he modeled his portrayal of the character Viktor Navorski in the film The Terminal on his father-in-law.

Career

Film, television, theater 
Wilson's career began with a guest appearance on The Brady Bunch in the 1972 episode "Greg's Triangle," where she played Pat Conway, one of the candidates running against Marcia Brady for head cheerleader. She also twice appeared on M*A*S*H in 1982 as Nurse Lacey as well as the sitcoms Three's Company and Bosom Buddies starring her future husband Tom Hanks, and as Hester Rose Crane, the deceased mother of Frasier Crane on Frasier. 

In the 1980s, Wilson attended the London Academy of Music and Dramatic Art in England.

She has appeared in numerous films, including Volunteers, Barbarians at the Gate, The Bonfire of the Vanities, Mixed Nuts, Sleepless in Seattle, Now and Then, That Thing You Do!, Jingle All the Way, Runaway Bride, Invisible Child, The Story of Us, Raise Your Voice, It's Complicated, and Larry Crowne.

On television, she played Susan Borman, wife of astronaut Frank Borman, in the HBO miniseries From the Earth to the Moon. She guest starred in many series, including Frasier, Curb Your Enthusiasm, Law & Order: Special Victims Unit, Body of Proof, and had recurring roles on The Good Wife and Girls.

She was instrumental in helping actress-playwright Nia Vardalos get the movie deal for My Big Fat Greek Wedding, which became the highest-grossing independent film of all time and for which she served as a producer. Wilson produced two stage productions of the play, as they were developing the film. A sequel, My Big Fat Greek Wedding 2, which Wilson co-produced and in which she had a supporting role, was released in 2016.

Wilson's own Greek heritage was honored in 2016 when the Greek Postal Service ELTA commemorated her with a stamp along with five others. The other four depicted on stamps were the filmmaker Costa-Gavras, engineer and entrepreneur Peter Diamandis, journalist George Stephanopoulos, and billionaire businessman John Catsimatidis. In 2008, Wilson produced the film Mamma Mia!, and eight years later its sequel, Mamma Mia! Here We Go Again.

In 2006, Wilson made her Broadway debut where she performed the role of Roxie Hart in the revival of Chicago. In April 2015, Wilson announced that she was diagnosed with breast cancer and had undergone a double mastectomy and reconstructive surgery. After a one-month hiatus, she returned to Larry David's Fish in the Dark Broadway show, playing with his wife, Brenda. Off Broadway, she played various roles in Nora Ephron and Delia Ephron's play Love, Loss and What I Wore. She reprised her roles in the Los Angeles production at the Geffen Playhouse. Also at the Geffen, Wilson performed in Daniel Margulies' Pulitzer Prize-winning play, Dinner with Friends, directed by Tony Award winner Dan Sullivan. Wilson originated the role of "Mama" in the world premier of Lisa Loomer's play, Distracted, at the Mark Taper Forum, also in Los Angeles.

In March 2020, while filming in Australia, Hanks announced through his Instagram profile that the couple had contracted COVID-19 and were experiencing minor symptoms while he was shooting an upcoming film Elvis (as Colonel Tom Parker) with director Baz Luhrmann in Australia. Before they were returned to quarantine, they were admitted to the Gold Coast University Hospital. On March 27, Wilson and her husband returned home to Los Angeles after they recovered from the virus. The couple decided to donate their blood antibodies for virus research.

Music 
Wilson's debut solo album AM/FM was released on May 8, 2012, on Decca Records. The album featured classics from the 1960s/70s, including a cover of "Wichita Lineman" that she performed with the song's writer-composer Jimmy Webb. She also performed a duet of "All I Have To Do Is Dream" with former Soundgarden and Audioslave musician Chris Cornell. Additional harmonies on the album come from Faith Hill, Sheryl Crow, Vince Gill, and Patti Scialfa (who also produced the track "Come See About Me" with Ron Aniello).

At the National Christmas Tree Lighting Ceremony in Washington, DC on December 4, 2014, she performed for President Obama and Michelle Obama, and served as co-host of the event.

In 2016, Wilson began writing her own songs with the help of co-writer, the Grammy-nominated Kara Dioguardi. The first song she wrote and sang was "Grateful" (later appearing on the self-titled album, Rita Wilson) with Dioguardi and Jason Reeves. Earlier, in 2014, Wilson wrote the song "Bad Things" with Matt Nathanson, for the Scott Eastwood film Dawn Patrol, in which she also starred.

That same year, her second album, Rita Wilson, was released. Wilson co-wrote all the songs on the album with Dan Wilson, Kara Dioguardi, Jason Reeves, Darrell Brown, Sugarland's Kristian Bush, Richard Marx, Lauren Christy, Mikal Blue, Nathan Chapman, Jason Wade, Stephanie Chapman, Ron Aniello, Jillian Jacqueline, Jessi Alexander, JR Randall, Yugomir Lonich, Blair Daly, and Kelly Archer. The song "Strong Tonight" was performed by Connie Britton on the ABC television show, Nashville, in the opening of the episode in which it was included.

The New York Times said: "Ms. Wilson has a catch in her voice that conveys yearning and potential heartbreak behind a facade of cheer."

To support the release of Rita Wilson, she opened on a tour with Chicago; she has said she is a lifelong fan of the band.

A year later, Wilson presented "Liner Notes: Songwriters, Stories and Music with Rita Wilson and Friends", where she sang, and also invited other singer/songwriters to participate in the event. The show, which took place at the Audrey Skirball Kenis Theater at the Geffen Playhouse in Los Angeles, included Patty Smyth, Desmond Child, Jeff Barry, Kristian Bush, among others.

With her third album, Bigger Picture, Wilson drew directly from her personal life for its theme. The album, released September 28, 2018, reunited her with producer Fred Mollin (Johnny Mathis, Jimmy Webb, and Kris Kristofferson); the pair originally worked together on her debut album AM/FM in 2012. Wilson once again wrote originals such as the title track and others with Kristian Bush and Darrell Brown, as well as new partners The Warren Brothers, Lindy Robbins and Alex Reid. The set also included covers of Cat Stevens' "The Wind" and Burt Bacharach/Hal David's "What the World Needs Now is Love."

Also, in 2018, Wilson's original song, "Heart Unknown", was used in the indie film, Simple Wedding. She performed the song, which she co-wrote with Josh Alexander, Kara Dioguardi, and Mozella. In addition, she performed "Sometimes Love", co-written with David Hodges, for the independent film Emmett, in which she also stars.

On March 29, 2019, Wilson released her fourth album, Halfway to Home which included "Throw Me a Party", a song inspired by her survival from breast cancer. Other songs were created during a writing workshop that partnered her with Mozella, Mitch Allan (Demi Lovato), Kara DioGuardi (Pink), Liz Rose and Krisian Bush. Halfway to Home was co-produced by Nathan Chapman, who has worked regularly with Taylor Swift. "Halfway to Home finds Wilson pulling from musical traditions that revere deep storytelling (Southern California rock, classic Nashville country), which was a hallmark for her growing up," explained Rolling Stone.

In the course of her music career, Wilson has performed her songs on Ellen, The Tonight Show Starring Jimmy Fallon, The Late Late Show with James Corden, Jimmy Kimmel Live!, and Today.

In March 2020 after she and husband contracted the coronavirus while filming in Australia and in self-quarantine and going "stir crazy", she filmed an Instagram video showing her rapping the Naughty by Nature song, "Hip Hop Hooray". The video went viral and reached Naughty by Nature's Vin Rock. After she and husband both fully recovered from virus, the two teamed up for a "Hip Hop Hooray" remix that benefit the MusiCares COVID-19 Relief Fund.

In July 2020, Wilson appeared on Jimmie Allen's Bettie James EP, collaborating on the song "When This Is Over" with Tauren Wells and The Oak Ridge Boys. Wilson collaborated with Allen again on her duets album Now & Forever, which was released in September 2022.

In 2022, Wilson collaborated with Sebastián Yatra on the single "Til You're Home" from the soundtrack to the film A Man Called Otto.

Journalism 
Wilson has been a contributing editor to Harper's Bazaar magazine, writing over twenty-one articles. She also started, and was Editor at Large of, a section on The Huffington Post called Huff/Post50, which explored issues and topics relative to people over fifty years old. She has also written for O, The Oprah Magazine.

Personal life 

Wilson married actor Tom Hanks in 1988. Hanks already had two children, Colin and Elizabeth Hanks, and Wilson became their stepmother. She has two sons of her own with Hanks, Chet and Truman. Wilson has three grandchildren.

She is a member of the Greek Orthodox Church.

Activism 
In 2015, Wilson signed an open letter on which the ONE Campaign had been collecting signatures. The letter was addressed to Angela Merkel and Nkosazana Dlamini-Zuma, urging them to focus on women as they serve as the head of the G7 in Germany and the AU in South Africa respectively. The G7 and AU were expected to set the priorities in development funding before a main UN summit in September 2015 that was to establish new development goals for the generation.

Philanthropy 
For over 20 years, Wilson and her husband, Tom Hanks, have been honorary co-chairs along with Steven Spielberg and Kate Capshaw of the Women's Cancer Research Fund (WCRF), specializing in raising money for women's cancers. In 2016, WCRF joined forces with Evelyn Lauder's Breast Cancer Research Foundation. Wilson contributed to the Moffitt Cancer Center by donating "True Hearts" jewelry made of sterling silver and 14k gold.

Wilson has credited Rosie O'Donnell as inspiration for her charitable work, particularly with cancer and children's charities. She and her husband have long supported the Shakespeare Center of Los Angeles, going back to 1989 when Wilson appeared as Celia in a production of As You Like It. Their annual Simply Shakespeare event raises funds to support programs for underprivileged youth. Musicians at the fundraiser have included Paul McCartney, Paul Simon, Jackson Browne, Faith Hill, Tim McGraw, Ben Harper, Reba McEntire, and more. 

In 2018, Wilson and Hanks were honored with USC Shoah Foundation's Ambassadors For Humanity award in recognition of their "longstanding commitment to humanitarian causes and support of veterans". The couple also contribute to other charities including AIDS Project Los Angeles, and many more.

Wilson and her husband have also made a significant contribution in helping the people who suffered from the Mati Fire in Greece. This has earned her and Hanks an offer of honorary naturalization in Greece from the Greek President Prokopis Pavlopoulos on December 27, 2019.

Filmography

Film

Television

As musical performer

As producer

Discography 

Wilson is credited as co-writer for all tracks on Rita Wilson, Bigger Picture, and Halfway to Home.

References

External links 

 
 
 

1956 births
Living people
20th-century American actresses
21st-century American actresses
20th-century Eastern Orthodox Christians
21st-century Eastern Orthodox Christians
Actresses from Los Angeles
Alumni of the London Academy of Music and Dramatic Art
American film actresses
American film producers
American people of Bulgarian descent
American people of Greek descent
American stage actresses
American television actresses
American voice actresses
American women film producers
American women singers
Christians from California
Decca Records artists
Film producers from California
Greek Orthodox Christians from the United States
People with acquired Greek citizenship
Pomaks
Tom Hanks